Margaret Hendrie (née Griffith, 1935–1990) was a writer from the Oceanian nation of Nauru.  Hendrie wrote the Nauruan language lyrics for "Nauru Bwiema", the country's national anthem.  In preparation for the country's independence ceremonies celebrated in 1968, Hendrie's lyrics were adapted to music composed by the Australian musician Laurence Henry Hicks.

See also
 Joanne Gobure, another notable writer from Nauru

References
National Anthems of the World, 10th Edition; Cassell; 10th edition (August 29, 2002); p. 391; 

Nauruan women writers
National symbols of Nauru
1935 births
1990 deaths
National anthem writers
Nauruan poets
20th-century poets
20th-century women writers